Mario Mereghetti (born May 3, 1938 in Ossona, Italy) is retired Italian professional football player who played as a central midfielder.

Mereghetti began his career at Inter Milan, but after limited outings spent a season with Udinese in which he was a regular during the 1960-61 season. He returned to Inter for another season, but he moved on to Atalanta where he spent four seasons. He also played for Lazio, Varese and Lecco.

He returned to work at Inter after finishing his playing career.

Honours
 Coppa Italia winner: 1962/63.

External links
Profile at CarriereCalciatori.it

Italian footballers
1938 births
Living people
Serie A players
Inter Milan players
Udinese Calcio players
Atalanta B.C. players
S.S.D. Varese Calcio players
Calcio Lecco 1912 players
Association football midfielders